Frances Ruth Shand Kydd (previously Spencer, née Roche; 20 January 1936 – 3 June 2004) was the mother of Diana, Princess of Wales. She was the maternal grandmother of William, Prince of Wales and Prince Harry, Duke of Sussex, respectively first and fifth in the line of succession to the British throne. Following her divorce from Viscount Althorp in 1969, and Diana's death in 1997, Shand Kydd devoted the final years of her life to Catholic charity work.

Early life
She was born Frances Ruth Roche at Park House, on the royal estate at Sandringham, Norfolk, on 20 January 1936. Her birth was on the same day as the death of George V. Her father was Maurice Roche, 4th Baron Fermoy, a friend of George VI and the elder son of the American heiress Frances Ellen Work and her first husband, the 3rd Baron Fermoy. Her mother, Ruth Roche, Baroness Fermoy, a daughter of Colonel William Smith Gill, was a confidante and lady-in-waiting to Queen Elizabeth (later the Queen Mother). Since birth, she held the style of The Honourable as the daughter of a baron. She was educated at Downham School in Essex.

Marriage and children
On 1 June 1954, she married John Spencer, Viscount Althorp (later the 8th Earl Spencer), at Westminster Abbey. Queen Elizabeth II and other members of the royal family attended the wedding ceremony. She was 18 years old and became the youngest woman wed in Westminster Abbey since 1893.

They had five children:
 Lady Sarah McCorquodale (born 19 March 1955), who married Neil Edmund McCorquodale, a 2nd cousin once removed of Raine, Countess Spencer. Raine (née McCorquodale) was the stepmother of Lady Sarah, so Edmund was not really a blood relative.
 Jane Fellowes, Baroness Fellowes (born 11 February 1957), who married Robert Fellowes, Baron Fellowes, then Private Secretary to the Sovereign.
 The Honourable John Spencer, who died 10 hours after his birth on 12 January 1960.
 Diana, Princess of Wales (1 July 1961 – 31 August 1997), first wife of Charles III.
 Charles Spencer, 9th Earl Spencer (born 20 May 1964), who married firstly Victoria Lockwood, secondly Caroline Freud (née Hutton and former wife of Matthew Freud), and thirdly and presently, Karen Villeneuve.

According to leading gossip columnist and author Penny Junor "Johnny could be violent, and [Frances] felt she and her children would be safer out of the home." Their daughter Diana also recalled "seeing my father slap my mother across the face and I was hiding behind the door and she was crying."

Divorce and remarriage

Her marriage to Viscount Althorp was not a happy one and, in 1967, she left him to be with Peter Shand Kydd, an heir to a wallpaper fortune in Australia, whom she had met the year before. His half-brother was the former champion amateur jockey William Shand Kydd (1937–2014), who was the brother-in-law of John Bingham, 7th Earl of Lucan. Subsequently, she was called "the other woman" in Janet Shand Kydd's divorce action against her husband. Frances lived with her two youngest children, Diana and Charles, in London during the separation in 1967, but during that year's Christmas holidays, Viscount Althorp refused to let his children return to London with their mother. He was granted custody of their children by the courts after his former mother-in-law, Lady Fermoy, testified against her own daughter Frances.

Frances and Peter Shand Kydd were married on 2 May 1969 and lived on the Scottish island of Seil, where they bought an 18th-century farmhouse called Ardencaple, 10 kilometres from Oban. She divided her time between London, Seil and another sheep farm in Yass, New South Wales. On 14 July 1976, John Spencer, now the 8th Earl Spencer, married Raine, Countess of Dartmouth, daughter of the novelist Dame Barbara Cartland. Although Frances lived a quiet life, she was forced into public view following the engagement of her daughter Diana to Prince Charles on 24 February 1981. Frances and her second husband Peter separated in June 1988. In 1993 Shand Kydd married Marie-Pierre Palmer (née Bécret), a French woman who ran a champagne-importing business in London.

Later years
In 1996, she was banned from driving after being convicted of drink-driving, but denied she had a problem with alcohol. She and Diana quarrelled in May 1997, after she told Hello! magazine that Diana was happy to lose her title of "Royal Highness" following her controversial divorce from Prince Charles. She was reportedly not on speaking terms with her daughter by the time of Diana's death.

She spent her later years in solitude on Seil. She became a Catholic and devoted herself to Catholic charities. She eventually became involved with HCPT - The Hosanna House and Children's Pilgrimage Trust, the Royal National Mission for Deep Sea Fishermen, the Mallaig and Northwest Fishermen's Association, and the National Search and Rescue Dogs Association.

In October 2002, when Frances left her Scottish home to give testimony at the trial of Diana's former butler, Paul Burrell, burglars targeted her house and stole her jewellery.

Death and burial
Frances died at her home in Scotland at the age of 68 on 3 June 2004, following a long illness that included Parkinson's disease and brain cancer. Her funeral at the Roman Catholic cathedral in Oban on 10 June was attended by her children, sister and grandchildren, including princes William (who gave a reading) and Harry. Their father, her former son-in-law, Prince Charles, did not attend because he was travelling to Washington to represent the royal family at the state funeral of the former US President Ronald Reagan the following day. Frances was buried in Pennyfuir Cemetery in Oban, Argyll and Bute.

Biography
In 2004, Maxine Riddington published a biographical book about her, entitled Frances: The Remarkable Story of Princess Diana's Mother.

Ancestry

References

External links
 Althorp House
 Visit Scotland, Isle of Seil page

1936 births
2004 deaths
Althorp
Converts to Roman Catholicism from Anglicanism
Daughters of barons
British people of American descent
British people of Indian descent
British people of Irish descent
British people of Scottish descent
British Roman Catholics
People from Sandringham, Norfolk
Frances
Frances Shand Kydd
People from Argyll and Bute
Seil
Deaths from cancer in Scotland
Neurological disease deaths in Scotland
Deaths from brain tumor
Deaths from Parkinson's disease